The National Democratic Youth League of Wa State is the youth wing of the United Wa State Party (UWSP), the ruling party of the de facto independent Wa State in Shan State, Myanmar. The organisation imitates the structure of the Communist Youth League of China.

History 
Members of its first working committee were elected on 7 December 2015. Its first work committee meeting was held in the capital city of Wa State, Pangkham, on 13 March 2016. Its general secretary is Zhao Ainalai.

References 

Youth organisations based in Myanmar
Youth wings of communist parties